Dritan Preci (born 11 June 1975), commonly known as Tony Preci is a Kosovan former footballer who played in the Western Ontario Soccer League, Canadian National Soccer League, USL A-League, and the Canadian Professional Soccer League.

Club career 
Preci immigrated to Canada in 1995 and signed with London Croatia in the Western Ontario Soccer League. He also played with London City in the Canadian National Soccer League. In 1999, he signed with Toronto Lynx in the USL A-League, and made his debut on May 2, 1999 against Minnesota Thunder. In total he played in 4 matches for Toronto. The following season he signed with Toronto Croatia of the Canadian Professional Soccer League. He made his debut on June 7, 2000 against North York Astros. In his debut season with Croatia he featured in the CPSL Championship against Toronto Olympians, where they won the title by a score of 2-1.

References 

1975 births
Living people
Sportspeople from Pristina
Association football midfielders
Kosovan footballers
London City players
Toronto Lynx players
Toronto Croatia players
Canadian National Soccer League players
A-League (1995–2004) players
Canadian Soccer League (1998–present) players
Kosovan expatriate footballers
Expatriate soccer players in Canada